Kim Jihn-eui (born July 30, 1946) is a South Korean theoretical physicist. His research interests concentrate on particle physics and cosmology and has many contributions to the field, most notably the suggestion of the invisible axion.

Birth and education
Kim was born in Gurye, South Jeolla Province in 1946. He graduated from Kyunggi High School and earned his bachelor's degree in chemical engineering from Seoul National University in 1971. He earned his Ph.D in particle physics from University of Rochester in 1975. He became a research associate at Brown University from 1975 to 1977 and worked as a research investigator at University of Pennsylvania to 1980. Then he was appointed to assistant professor of Seoul National University in 1980 and had been there until retirement in 2011. Afterwards he took a position at Gwangju Institute of Science and Technology in Gwangju. Currently he is distinguished professor and eminent scholar at Kyung Hee University.

He was also a professor in School of Physics at Korea Institute for Advanced Study from 1998 to 1999 and held many inviting positions from other institutions including CERN, University of Michigan, Harvard University and University of Bonn.

Research
Kim's research is focused on the elementary particle theory and particle cosmology.
He suggested the invisible axion model known as the KSVZ (Kim–Shifman–Vainshtein–Zakharov) model, which provides a solution to the strong CP problem in the standard model.
He also advocated that the axino, the supersymmetric dual of axion, can be a strong candidate of dark matter of our universe
and contended that it might have played an important role in the formation of galaxies and may offer a significant part of the current energy density of the universe. 
His review about the neutral current gave a good understanding of the Glashow–Salam–Weinberg model to the field.
With H. P. Nilles, he formulated and presented the solution of the μ problem in supergravity, 
then he led the calculation of the cosmological effect of the gravitino.
From the collapse effect of the supergraviton which interacts much weaker than a light axion or axino,
Kim obtained the upper limit of the reheating temperature of the universe 109GeV and that made an early contribution 
of the field of cosmological research about heavy and weak interacting particles.
He also did the first attempt to get the Standard Model from the superstring theory.
He contributed to the development of standard model from the higher-dimensional theories by reducing the dimensions of orbifold
and was absorbed in the cosmological constant problem and gave a clue of the solution of it in 5d spacetime.

Honors and awards
 1987 Korea Science Award
 1992 Ho-Am Prize
 2001 Humboldt Prize

Bibliography

See also
 KSVZ axion
 Axino

References

External links
 Jihn E. Kim (homepage)
 Publications on the arXiv
 Scientific publications of Kim Jihn-eui on INSPIRE-HEP

1946 births
Living people
South Korean physicists
Kyunggi High School alumni
Seoul National University alumni
Academic staff of Seoul National University
University of Rochester alumni
Theoretical physicists
Recipients of the Ho-Am Prize in Science
People associated with CERN
Academic staff of Gwangju Institute of Science and Technology